Buyeo FC was a South Korean football club based in the county of Buyeo. The club was a member of the K3 League, an semi-professional league and the fourth tier of league football in South Korea, since the 2016 season.

Honours

Season by season records

See also
 List of football clubs in South Korea

External links
 Buyeo FC official website 

K3 League (2007–2019) clubs
Sport in South Chungcheong Province
Buyeo County
Association football clubs established in 2015
Association football clubs disestablished in 2019
Defunct football clubs in South Korea
2015 establishments in South Korea
2019 disestablishments in South Korea